This is a list of top-division association football clubs in CONCACAF countries. CONCACAF is the football confederation that oversees the sport in North America, Central America and the Caribbean, including the South American countries of Guyana, Suriname and French Guiana.

All countries and most of the dependent territories in this region have their own football associations which are members of CONCACAF, with the exceptions being Greenland and Saint-Pierre and Miquelon which are not members of CONCACAF or any other football confederation. The French Overseas Departments of French Guiana, Guadeloupe and Martinique, as well as Saint-Martin and Sint Maarten (the French and Dutch parts of the island of Saint Martin), also have their own football associations which are members of CONCACAF (but are not members of FIFA).

Each of the CONCACAF member countries have their own football league systems. The clubs playing in each top-level league compete for the title as the country's club champions, and also for places in next season's CONCACAF club competition, the CONCACAF Champions League (either directly for teams in the North American and Central American Zones, or through the CFU Club Championship for teams in the Caribbean Zone). Due to promotion and relegation, the clubs playing in the top-level league are different every season for some countries; however, some league systems (such as those of the United States and Canada) do not have promotion and relegation. The North American SuperLiga (North America) was an official tournament approved by the CONCACAF between the US/Canadian and Mexican leagues.

The champions of the previous season in each country are listed in bold. If the season is divided into Apertura and Clausura without a single season title, both champions of the previous season are bolded.

Some clubs play in a national football league other than their own country's. Where this is the case the club is noted as such.
For clubs playing at lower divisions, see the separate articles linked to in the relevant sections.
For clubs belonging to any of the other five continental football confederations of the world, see List of association football clubs.

Anguilla 

Football association: Anguilla Football Association
Top-level league: AFA Football League

As of 2023 season:

Antigua and Barbuda 

Football association: Antigua and Barbuda Football Association
Top-level league: Digicel/Red Stripe Premier Division

As of 2022–23 season:

Aruba 

Football association: Arubaanse Voetbal Bond
Top-level league: Aruban Division di Honor

As of 2022–23 season:

Bahamas 

Football association: Bahamas Football Association
Top-level league: BFA Senior League

As of 2022-23 season:

Barbados 

Football association: Barbados Football Association
Top-level league: Digicel Premier League

As of 2023 season:

Belize 

Football association: Football Federation of Belize
Top-level league: Premier League of Belize

As of 2022–23 season:

Bermuda 

Football association: Bermuda Football Association
Top-level league: Digicel Premier Division

As of 2022-23 season:

The club below played in a league consisting mostly of clubs from the United States.

Bonaire 

Football association: Bonaire Football Federation
Top-level league: Bonaire League

As of 2022 season:

Bonaire League

British Virgin Islands 

Football association: British Virgin Islands Football Association
Top-level league: BVIFA National Football League

As of 2022-23 season:

Canada

 Country:  Canada
 Football association: Canadian Soccer Association
 Top-level league: Canadian Premier League
As of the 2023 season:

The following clubs participate in Major League Soccer, the top-division football league of the United States. They contest the Canadian Championship for the Voyageurs Cup, along with Canadian Premier League teams and lower-level clubs to determine Canada's entrant into the CONCACAF Champions League.

Cayman Islands 

Football association: Cayman Islands Football Association
Top-level league: Cayman Island Premier League

As of 2020-21 season:

Costa Rica 

Football association: Federación Costarricense de Fútbol
Top-level league: Primera División

As of 2022-23 season:

Cuba 

Football association: Asociación de Fútbol de Cuba
Top-level league: Campeonato Nacional

As of 2016 season:

Curaçao 

Football association: Curaçao Football Federation
Top-level league: Curaçao League First Division

As of 2017 season:

Sekshon Pagá

Dominica 

Football association: Dominica Football Association
Top-level league: Dominica Premiere League

As of 2011–12 season:

Dominican Republic 

Football association: Federación Dominicana de Fútbol
Top-level league: Liga Mayor

As of 2016 season:

El Salvador 

Football association: Federación Salvadoreña de Fútbol
Top-level league: Salvadoran Primera División

As of 2017–18 season:

French Guiana 

Football association: Ligue de Football de La Guyane Française
Top-level league: Championnat National

As of 2016–17 season:

Grenada 

Football association: Grenada Football Association
Top-level league: Digicel Premier Division

As of 2016 season:

Guadeloupe 

Football association: Ligue Guadeloupéenne de Football
Top-level league: Division d'Honneur

As of 2012 season:

Guatemala 

Football association: FedefutGuate
Top-level league: Liga Nacional de Guatemala

As of 2019–20 season:

Guyana 

Football association: Guyana Football Federation
Top-level leagues:GFF National Super League
As of 2017 season:

Haiti 

Football association: Fédération Haïtienne de Football
Top-level league: Championnat de Premiere Division

As of 2016–17 season:

Honduras 

Football association: FENAFUTH
Top-level league: Liga Nacional

As of 2017–18 season:

Jamaica 

Football association: Jamaica Football Federation
Top-level league: Red Stripe Premier League

As of 2016–17 season:

Martinique 

Football association: Ligue de Football de Martinique
Top-level league: Championnat National

As of 2015–16 season:

Mexico 

Country:  Mexico
Football association: Mexican Football Federation (Spanish: Federación Mexicana de Fútbol Asociación)
Top-level league: Liga MX (men), Liga MX Femenil (women)

As of the 2022–23 season:

Montserrat 

Football association: Montserrat Football Association
Top-level league: Montserrat Championship

As of 2003–04 season:

Nicaragua

Football association: Federación Nicaragüense de Fútbol
Top-level league: Primera División de Nicaragua

As of 2017–18 season:

Panama 

Football association: Federación Panameña de Fútbol
Top-level league: ANAPROF

As of 2013–14 season:

Puerto Rico 

Football association: Federación Puertorriqueña de Fútbol
Top-level league: Puerto Rico Soccer League and Liga Nacional de Fútbol de Puerto Rico

As of 2021-22 season:
Liga PR

Liga Nacional de Fútbol de Puerto Rico

This team played in the North American Soccer League in the United States.

Saint Kitts and Nevis 

Football association: Saint Kitts and Nevis Football Association
Top-level league: Saint Kitts and Nevis Premier Division

As of 2011–12 season:

Saint Lucia 

Country:  Saint Lucia
Football association: Saint Lucia National Football Union
Top-level league: Saint Lucia Gold Division

As of 2011 season:

Saint-Martin 

Football association: Comité de Football des Îles du Nord
Top-level leagues: Saint-Martin Première Division, Saint-Barthélemy League

As of 2004–05 season:
Saint-Martin Première Division

As of 2005–06 season:
Saint-Barthélemy League

Saint Vincent and the Grenadines 

Football association: Saint Vincent and the Grenadines Football Federation
Top-level league: National Championship

As of 2006–07 season:

Sint Maarten 

Football association: Sint Maarten Soccer Association
Top-level league: Sint Maarten League

As of 2005–06 season:

Suriname 

Country:  Suriname
Football association: Surinaamse Voetbal Bond
Top-level league: Topklasse

As of 2015–16 season:

Trinidad and Tobago

Country:  Trinidad and Tobago
Football association: Trinidad and Tobago Football Association
Top-level league: TT Pro League

As of 2012–13 season:

Turks and Caicos Islands 

Football association: TCIFA
Top-level league: MFL League

As of 2006–07 season:

United States 

Country:  United States
Football association: United States Soccer Federation
Top-level league: Major League Soccer (men), National Women's Soccer League (women)

As of the 2023 Major League Soccer season: 

As of the 2022 National Women's Soccer League season:

United States Virgin Islands 

Football association: Soccer VI
Top-level leagues: St Croix Soccer League, St Thomas League

As of 2006–07 season:

St Croix Soccer League

St Thomas Soccer League

See also

List of top-division football clubs in AFC countries
List of second division football clubs in AFC countries
List of top-division football clubs in CAF countries
List of top-division football clubs in CONMEBOL countries
List of top-division football clubs in OFC countries
List of top-division football clubs in UEFA countries
List of second division football clubs in UEFA countries
List of top-division football clubs in non-FIFA countries
Domestic football champions

Footnotes

Notes

References
CONCACAF. Last accessed November 2, 2006.
The RSSSF Archive - Domestic Results (America), Rec.Sport.Soccer Statistics Foundation. Last accessed November 2, 2006.
World Football Database, North America, World Football Organization. Last accessed November 2, 2006.

+CONCACAF
Association football in North America
Top level association football leagues in North America